Perseus Freeing Andromeda is the title of several paintings, including:

Perseus Freeing Andromeda (Piero di Cosimo)
Perseus Freeing Andromeda (Rubens)
Perseus Freeing Andromeda (Wtewael)